The Bravest Way is a 1918 American silent drama film directed by George Melford and written by Edith M. Kennedy. The film stars Sessue Hayakawa, Florence Vidor, Tsuru Aoki, Yukio Aoyama, Jane Wolfe, and Winter Hall. The film was released on June 16, 1918, by Paramount Pictures.

Plot
As described in a film magazine, Kara Tamura (Hayakawa), a humble worker studying landscape gardening, and Shiro Watana (Aoyama), a trusted clerk, live together in San Francisco. Watana sends for his wife Sat-u (Aoki) and children from Japan, and Tamura dreams of the day when he will have enough money to marry Nume Rogers, a teacher at a nearby kindergarten. Watana is mysteriously murdered. Sat-u arrives and Tamura takes her into his home. Meddlesome neighbors compel Tamura to marry Sat-u, and Nume, heartbroken, accepts the offer of a wealthy man to cultivate her voice as an opera singer. Three years pass and Sat-u is fatally ill. Before she dies, she explains to Nume Tamura's reason for marrying her. Watana's uncle places his property in Tamura's hands for his sacrifice, and Nume and Tamura are reunited.

Cast
Sessue Hayakawa as Kara Tamura
Florence Vidor as Nume Rogers
Tsuru Aoki as Sat-u
Yukio Aoyama as Shiro Watana
Jane Wolfe as Miss Tompkins
Winter Hall as Moreby Nason
Kisaburo Kurihara as Sam Orson 
Josephine Crowell as Janitress
Goro Kino as Motoyoshi
Clarence Geldart as The Minister
Guy Oliver as The Lawyer
William Elmer

References

External links

1910s English-language films
Silent American drama films
1918 drama films
Paramount Pictures films
Films directed by George Melford
American black-and-white films
American silent feature films
1910s American films